This article is a list of statistics and records relating to Houston Dynamo. The Houston Dynamo is an American professional soccer club based in Houston, Texas. The club was founded in 2006 and plays in Major League Soccer. 

This list encompasses the major honors won by Houston Dynamo and records set by the club, their coaches, and their players. The player records section includes details of the club's leading goal scorers and those who have made most appearances in first-team competitions. It also records notable achievements by Houston Dynamo players on the international stage. The club's attendance records at Robertson Stadium are also included in the list.

Honors
Houston Dynamo's first trophy was the Carolina Challenge Cup, a preseason tournament before the 2006 campaign.  Houston went on to win the 2006 MLS Cup before duplicating the feat in the 2007 MLS Cup. They returned to the MLS cup in 2011 and 2012, both times Falling to the host Los Angeles Galaxy. In 2015 the Dynamo won they're third Carolina Challenge Cup and two years later won another preseason tournament, The Desert Diamond Cup.

Domestic
MLS Cup (2) 2006, 2007
runners up (2) 2011, 2012
Supporters Shield
 runners up(1) 2008
 U.S. Open Cup (1) 2018

Preseason and Friendly Trophies
Dynamo Charities Cup (5): 
 2009 : 2–1 vs. Monterrey

 2010 : 4–0 vs. Águila

 2013 : 2–0 vs. Stoke City

 2015 : 4–0 vs. Santos Laguna

 2016 : 3–3 (5–4p) vs. Real Sociedad
Carolina Challenge Cup (3): 2006, 2007, 2015
Texas Pro Soccer Festival (1): 2008
Desert Diamond Cup (1): 2017

Player Stats

All current players are in bold

Most appearances
Competitive, professional matches only. MLS Playoffs count as other.  Substitutions count as appearances. Correct as of the end of the 2021 season.

Most Goals

Major League Soccer
As of February 18, 2022

 Most goals scored in MLS: 56  – Brian Ching , 2006–2013
 Most goals in one MLS season: 19  – Mauro Manotas, 2018
 Most goals scored in one MLS game: 4  – Brian Ching, against Colorado Rapids in 2006.
 Most MLS hat-tricks in one season: 1  – Seven players tied
 Most MLS hat-tricks overall: 2 – Brian Ching.

U.S. Open Cup
As of February 18, 2022

 Most goals scored in U.S. Open Cup: 10 – Mauro Manotas, 2015–2020
 Most goals scored in one Open Cup game: 2 – Alejandro Moreno, against Carolina Dynamo in 2006; Geoff Cameron against Charleston Battery in 2009; Mauro Manotas, against Sporting Kansas City in 2016; Memo Rodríguez and Aldo Quintanilla, against NTX Rayados in 2018; Mauro Manotas and Romell Quioto against Sporting Kansas City in 2018; Mauro Manotas against the Philadelphia Union in 2018
 Most goals scored in one Open Cup season: 6 – Mauro Manotas 2018

Hat-tricks 

*Dynamo goals listed first.

Most Assists
Competitive, professional matches only. Current as of the end of the 2021 season.

Most Yellow Cards 
Competitive, professional matches only. Current as of the end of the 2020 season.

Most Red Cards 
Competitive, professional matches only. Current as of the end of the 2020 season.

Goalkeeping
MLS regular season matches only. Current as of the end of the 2021 season

Coaching records 
All statistics are correct .
First full-time head coach: Dominic Kinnear.
Longest spell as head coach: Dominic Kinnear (managed the club for 288 league matches from April 2006 to October 2014).
 Most seasons as coach: Dominic Kinnear, nine seasons from 2006 to 2014.
 Most consecutive seasons as coach: Dominic Kinnear, nine consecutive seasons from 2006 to 2014.
 Most trophies won as coach: Dominic Kinnear, 2 MLS Cup titles and 4 conference titles between 2006 and 2014.

Club records

Matches
First match: 1–0 vs Charleston Battery, Carolina Challenge Cup 2006, March 18, 2006
First league match: 5–2 vs Colorado Rapids, April 2, 2006
First U.S. Open Cup match: 4–2 vs Carolina Dynamo, Fourth Round, August 2, 2006
First CONCACAF match: 0–1 vs Puntarenas F.C., Quarterfinals, February 22, 2007
First match at Robertson Stadium: 5–2 vs Colorado Rapids, April 2, 2006
First match at BBVA Compass Stadium: 1–0 vs DC United, May 8, 2012

Record wins
Record win: 5–0 vs FC Dallas, March 12, 2016
Record League win: 5–0 vs FC Dallas, March 12, 2016
 Record US Open Cup win: 5–0 vs NTX Rayados, June 6, 2018
Record International win: 4–0 vs Atlante F.C., SuperLiga 2008,  July 12, 2008; vs CD FAS , 2012 CONCACAF Champions League, September 20, 2012
Record home win 5–0 vs FC Dallas, March 12, 2016
Record away win: 4–0 vs Chicago Fire, July 12, 2007; vs DC United, May 8, 2013

Record defeats
Record League defeats: 0–5 vs Montreal Impact, August 24, 2013; 0–5 vs Atlanta United, July 17,2019

Record U.S. Cup defeat: 0–3 vs FC Dallas, 2013 Lamar Hunt U.S. Open Cup, June 12, 2013
Record CONCACAF defeat: 0–3 vs Deportivo Saprissa, 2008 CONCACAF Champions Cup Semifinals,  April 9, 2008
Record home defeat: 0–3 vs multiple
Record away defeat: 0–5 vs Montreal Impact, August 24, 2013

Streaks
Longest unbeaten run: 14 (all competitions), June 3 to August 1. 2007
Longest unbeaten run: 11 (league competitions), June 3 to July 22, 2007
Longest Home unbeaten run: 36, July 9, 2011 to May 12, 2013
Longest winless run: 16 (league competitions), May 29 to September 3, 2021

Wins/draws/losses in a season
Most wins in a league season: 15 2007
Most draws in a league season: 13 2006, 2011, 2016
Most defeats in a league season: 18 2019
Fewest wins in a league season: 4 2020
Fewest draws in a league season: 4 2019
Fewest defeats in a league season: 5 2008

Goals 
Most league goals in a season: 58, 2018
Fewest league goals in a season: 30, 2020
Most league goals allowed in a season: 59; 2019
Fewest league goals allowed in a season: 23; 2007

Points
Most points in a season: 53 in 34 matches, 2012
Fewest points in a season: 21 in 23 matches, 2020

Attendance
Record home attendance: 70,550 v Los Angeles Galaxy at Reliant Stadium, 2006 Major League Soccer season, August 9, 2006
Record home attendance at Robertson Stadium: 30,972 vs Kansas City Wizards, 2007 MLS Cup Playoffs, November 10, 2007
Record home attendance at Robertson Stadium (MLS Regular Season): 30,588 vs LA Galaxy, 2007 Major League Soccer season, October 7, 2007
Record home attendance at BBVA Compass Stadium: 22,661 vs Seattle Sounders FC, 2017 MLS Cup Playoffs, November 21, 2015
Record home attendance at BBVA Compass Stadium (MLS Regular Season): 22,651 vs Chicago Fire, 2015 Major League Soccer season, July 3, 2015

Notes and references

Houston Dynamo FC

de:Houston Dynamo
es:Houston Dynamo
fr:Houston Dynamo
hr:Houston Dynamo
it:Houston Dynamo
he:יוסטון דינמו
nl:Houston Dynamo
ja:ヒューストン・ダイナモ
no:Houston Dynamo
pl:Houston Dynamo
pt:Houston Dynamo
ru:Хьюстон Динамо
simple:Houston Dynamo
fi:Houston Dynamo
sv:Houston Dynamo
zh:休斯敦迪纳摩